Immunostimulants, also known as immunostimulators, are substances (drugs and nutrients) that stimulate the immune system by inducing activation or increasing activity of any of its components. One notable example is the granulocyte macrophage colony-stimulating factor.

Classification
There are two main categories of immunostimulants:
Specific immunostimulants provide antigenic specificity in immune response, such as vaccines or any antigen.
Non-specific immunostimulants act irrespective of antigenic specificity to augment immune response of other antigen or stimulate components of the immune system without antigenic specificity, such as adjuvants and non-specific immunostimulators.

Non-specific
Many endogenous substances are non-specific immunostimulators. For example, female sex hormones are known to stimulate both adaptive and innate immune responses. Some autoimmune diseases such as lupus erythematosus strike women preferentially, and their onset often coincides with puberty. Other hormones appear to regulate the immune system as well, most notably prolactin, growth hormone and vitamin D.

Some publications point towards the effect of deoxycholic acid (DCA) as an immunostimulant of the non-specific immune system, activating its main actors, the macrophages. According to these publications, a sufficient amount of DCA in the human body corresponds to a good immune reaction of the non-specific immune system.

Claims made by marketers of various products and alternative health providers, such as chiropractors, homeopaths, and acupuncturists to be able to stimulate or "boost" the immune system generally lack meaningful explanation and evidence of effectiveness.

See also

General
Antigen
Co-stimulation
Immunogenicity
Immunologic adjuvant
Immunomodulator
Immunotherapy

Endogenous immunostimulants
 Deoxycholic acid, a stimulator of macrophages

Synthetic immunostimulants
Imiquimod and resiquimod, activate immune cells through the toll-like receptor 7

References

External links
 Veterinary Immunology and Immunopathology journal
 
 Deoxycholic acid as immunostimulant

Immunology
Immune system